Domanakuh (formerly Sarghoy) is a village in central Tajikistan. It is part of the jamoat Sayliobod in Lakhsh District, one of the Districts of Republican Subordination. It lies near the river Kyzyl-Suu.

Notes

References

Populated places in Districts of Republican Subordination